The Dun Mountain-Maitai Terrane comprises the Dun Mountain Ophiolite Belt (also called the Mineral Belt), Maitai Group and Patuki Mélange. The Dun Mountain Ophiolite is an ophiolite of Permian age located in New Zealand's South Island. Prehistorically this ophiolite was quarried by Māori for both metasomatized argillite and pounamu (jade) which was used in the production of tools and jewellery.

In the late 1800s, the Dun Mountain Ophiolite Belt was surveyed for its economic potential. During this time the rock types dunite and rodingite (after Dun Mountain and the Roding River) were first named. Discovery of economic deposits of chromite near Nelson lead to the building of New Zealand’s first railway, however, extraction only occurred between 1862 and 1866. In the 20th century, serpentinite was mined for fertiliser and the ophiolite remains one of New Zealand's main sources of pounamu (jade), but all other mineral exploration has failed to find economic deposits.

Description 

The Dun Mountain Ophiolite Belt is composed of a typical ophiolite sequence of ultramafic rocks overlain by a plutonic then volcanic sequence, and finally by conglomerates and other sedimentary rocks of the Maitai Group. The unaltered ultramafic rocks are restricted to three massifs, Dun Mountain, the Red Hills and Red Mountain, elsewhere they are highly serpentinized. This ophiolite sequence is structurally underlain by the ophiolitic Patuki Mélange. The Dun Mountain Ophiolite Belt likely formed in a forearc environment.

Mantle lithologies
Dun Mountain Ultramafics Group
Wairere Serpentinite
Upukerora Mélange
Crustal igneous rocks
Otanomomo Complex
Livingstone Volcanics Group
Crustal sedimentary rock
Maitai Group
Upukerora Breccia
Wooded Peak Limestone
 Tramway Sandstone
 Greville Formation
 Little Ben Sandstone
 Stephens Subgroup
Basal mélange
Windon Mélange
Paruki Mélange

Distribution 

The Dun Mountain Ophiolite Belt is a locally intact approximately  section through oceanic crust. It is exposed between D'Urville Island in Marlborough District and St Arnaud in Tasman District, and Jackson Bay in the West Coast Region and Balclutha in Otago. The Dun Mountain Ophiolite Belt is exposed in the South Island and is inferred to exist at depth under the North Island. It is in two sections, as it is offset by the Alpine Fault, with sections to the west of the fault having been displaced northwards. The Dun Mountain-Maitai Terrane also extends at depth into the North Island as far as Northland.

See also 

 Geology of the Tasman District
 Stratigraphy of New Zealand
 Torlesse Composite Terrane
 Takaka Terrane

References

External links 
 New Zealand Stratigraphic Lexicon: Dun Mountain Ophiolite Belt
 Nelson Council: Protecting Dun Mountain and the Mineral Belt

Terranes
Geology of New Zealand
Ophiolites
Paleozoic Oceania
Geography of Nelson, New Zealand
Geography of the Marlborough Region
Geography of Otago
Geography of Southland, New Zealand
Geography of the Tasman District